Cyperus gardneri is a species of sedge that is native to parts of Central America and South America.

See also 
 List of Cyperus species

References 

gardneri
Plants described in 1842
Flora of Mexico
Flora of Cuba
Flora of Bolivia
Flora of Colombia
Flora of Argentina
Flora of Brazil
Flora of Ecuador
Flora of El Salvador
Flora of Venezuela
Taxa named by Christian Gottfried Daniel Nees von Esenbeck
Flora without expected TNC conservation status